Any Way You Can is the debut EP by Australian folk punk band Mutiny. It was self-released in 1993 and is the first time Mutiny appears on CD.

Track listing
 "Blue Light Olympics" - 4:13
 "Never Get Caught" - 3:29
 "Good Friend" - 4:41
 "Folk War" - 3:44
 "All I've Got" - 4:33
 "The Squatting Song" - 4:09
 "Rise Up" - 3:02

Credits
 Alice - bass
 L'hibou - fiddle
 Chris - vocals, drums, didgeridoo
 Greg - guitar, mandolin, vocals, samples
 Briony - vocals, 12 string guitar, mandolin

Mutiny (band) albums
1993 debut EPs